"Wake Up" is a song by Eskimo Joe, released in March 2001 as the lead single from their debut album Girl. 

At the ARIA Music Awards of 2001, the Ben Saunders directed video on the ARIA Award for Best Video.

Track listing

 Note: Program repeated both sides.

Release history

References

Eskimo Joe songs
2001 singles
ARIA Award-winning songs
Song recordings produced by Ed Buller
2001 songs
Songs written by Stuart MacLeod (musician)
Songs written by Joel Quartermain
Songs written by Kavyen Temperley